Rama Akkiraju is an Indian-born American computer scientist. She is vice president of AI for IT at Nvidia and performs research in the field of artificial intelligence.

Rama started her career at the T. J. Watson Research Center in New York and later moved to IBM Almaden Research Center. She served as the Distinguished Engineer and Director of Engineering at IBM's Watson Division from 2015 to 2019.

She was named an IBM Fellow in 2019. She has been an IBM Master Inventor since 2014.

Education
Rama received her MBA at New York University, Stern School of Business in 2004. She received her M.S. in Computer Science from Utah State University in 1995 and her B.Tech. in Electronics engineering from JNTU College of Engineering, in Andhra Pradesh, India in 1993.

Professional contributions 
Rama served as the President for ISSIP, a Service Science professional society for 2018, and actively drives AI projects through ISSIP. Rama is the co-chair for the AI Council at CompTIA industry forum. Rama has served as program committee chair, and program committee member for various academic conferences & journals including those organized by IEEE, and ACM.

Career and research
Rama has co-authored over 100 technical papers. Rama has 45+ issued patents and 25+ pending. She is the recipient of 4 best paper awards in AI and Operations Research areas from AAAI and INFORMs.
Akkiraju, Rama, Joel Farrell, John A. Miller, Meenakshi Nagarajan, Amit P. Sheth, and Kunal Verma. "Web service semantics-wsdl-s." (2005).
Doshi, Prashant, Richard Goodwin, Rama Akkiraju, and Kunal Verma. "Dynamic workflow composition: Using markov decision processes." International Journal of Web Services Research (IJWSR) 2, no. 1 (2005): 1–17.
Akkiraju, Rama, Richard Goodwin, Prashant Doshi, and Sascha Roeder. "A Method for Semantically Enhancing the Service Discovery Capabilities of UDDI." In IIWeb, pp. 87–92. 2003.
Elmeleegy, Hazem, Anca Ivan, Rama Akkiraju, and Richard Goodwin. "Mashup advisor: A recommendation tool for mashup development." In 2008 IEEE International Conference on Web Services, pp. 337–344. IEEE, 2008.
Rama has delivered many keynote addresses, podcasts and blog posts on artificial intelligence, bias, AI for IT operations etc.

References

External links
Rama Akkiraju at NVIDIA Research
NPR article on IBM's work by Akkiraju
IBM Tone Analyzer website
IBM: Humanizing Digital Conversations, by Akkiraju on App Developer Magazine

American women computer scientists
American computer scientists
IBM Fellows
IBM Research computer scientists
Living people
Year of birth missing (living people)
21st-century American women
Women educators
Computer scientists
Women in computing
IBM employees
IBM people
IBM Women